M. D. Lakshminarayana is an Indian National Congress political activist and member of the Karnataka Legislative Council. He was nominated to the council as an Independent.

See also 
 TA/DA scam

References 

Year of birth missing (living people)
Living people
Members of the Karnataka Legislative Council
Indian National Congress politicians from Karnataka